SPARC64 or sparc64 may refer to:

 sparc64, an alternative name used by free software projects for the SPARC V9 instruction set architecture
 HAL SPARC64, a microprocessor designed by HAL Computer Systems